Debre Birhan University (DBU) is a university in the city Debre Birhan, Amhara Region, Ethiopia. It is one of thirteen new universities which were established in 2007 by the Ethiopian government.

History
The foundation of the university was laid down in May 2005 and the building of the first phase was started in May 2006. Instruction  began in January 2007 with the enrolment of 725 students in the Faculty of Education with two streams, namely Businesses Education and Natural Science teaching. In the academic year of 2007/8, three additional Faculties (Business and Economics, Health Science and Agriculture) were opened, and the enrolment reached 2483. Furthermore, the university broadened its program and enrolled 393 summer/students and 500 Extension/evening students in 2006 and 2007 respectively.  After three more construction phases, in 2012 there were about 10,000 students at the university.

References

External links
 Historical background
 "Pedagogy-Based-Technology and Chemistry Students". US China Review
 Debre Birhan University main web page

Educational institutions established in 2007
2007 establishments in Ethiopia
Universities and colleges in Amhara Region